Laura Donaldson (born 12 January 1972) is a British freestyle skier. She competed in the women's moguls event at the 2002 Winter Olympics.

Career
Donaldson made her Winter Olympics debut at 2002 Winter Olympics at Salt Lake City. She was selected for the team late after some qualifying events were cancelled. She completed in women's moguls event, finished 29th.  She has skied at Europa Cup, World Cup, and Nor-Am Cup competitions.

References

External links
 

1972 births
Living people
British female freestyle skiers
Olympic freestyle skiers of Great Britain
Freestyle skiers at the 2002 Winter Olympics
Sportspeople from Glasgow